Triton is a collection of fantasy short stories by author L. Ron Hubbard.  It was first published in 1949 by Fantasy Publishing Company, Inc. in an edition of 1,200 copies.  The title novella first appeared in the April 1940 issue of  the magazine Unknown under the title "The Indigestible Triton" and under Hubbard's pseudonym "René Lafayette".  The other story first appeared in the magazine Fantasy Book.

Contents
 "Triton"
 "The Battle of the Wizards"

References

1949 short story collections
Fantasy short story collections
American short story collections
Works by L. Ron Hubbard
Fantasy Publishing Company, Inc. books